Russell Allen Thompkins Jr. (born March 21, 1951) is an American soul singer. Best known as the original lead singer of the vocal group The Stylistics and noted for his high tenor, countertenor, and falsetto vocals. With Russell as lead singer, The Stylistics had 12 straight Top 10 Billboard R&B singles, and 5 gold singles from 1971 through 1974.

Early Years
Born in Philadelphia, Thompkins was introduced to music by his father and started singing formally in school.  During high school, Thompkins was a member of a local vocal group called the Monarchs who defeated another group called the Percussions in a talent show at Benjamin Franklin High School.  Both groups disbanded shortly thereafter.  Their remaining members, Thompkins, James Smith, and Airrion Love from The Monarchs, and James Dunn and Herbie Murrell from the Percussions, joined together to form a new group called The Stylistics in 1968.

Career
In 1970, the Stylistics recorded "You're a Big Girl Now", which soon became a regional hit for Sebring Records.  The larger Avco Records soon signed the Stylistics, and the single eventually climbed to number seven on the R&B charts in early 1971.  Avco approached record producer Thom Bell to work with the group.  After the Stylistics auditioned for Bell he was unimpressed, but he ultimately agreed to produce them, because he believed in the potential of Thompkins's soaring high tenor voice.  Thom Bell focused the group's sound completely around Thompkins's voice.  On most of the group's hits, Bell would have Thompkins sing virtually solo.

From 1971 to 1974, the Stylistics had twelve consecutive U.S. R&B top ten hits and five top ten U.S. pop hits, including "Stop, Look, Listen (To Your Heart)", "You Are Everything", "Betcha by Golly, Wow", "Break Up to Make Up", and "You Make Me Feel Brand New".  All of these songs (and everything the group ever recorded) were led by Thompkins, and with the exception of "You're a Big Girl Now", written and composed by Thom Bell and lyricist Linda Creed (1974's "You Make Me Feel Brand New", a No. 2 pop hit, was also sung lead by group member Airrion Love).

Thom Bell stopped working with the group in 1974, and the split proved commercially devastating to the group's success in the U.S.  However, in 1975, the Stylistics did release one single which was commercially successful as an early disco track entitled, "Hey, Girl, Come and Get It". After 1976, the Stylistics general commercial decline was more pronounced, and they would only sporadically make the R&B charts in the next two decades. However, just as U.S. success began to wane, their popularity in Europe, and especially the United Kingdom, increased. The lighter "pop" sound fashioned by Van McCoy and Hugo & Luigi gave the band a UK No. 1 in 1975 with "Can't Give You Anything (But My Love)".

In 2000, Thompkins left the group saying he even regretted he had not left much earlier. After his split from the group, Thompkins studied music formally and learned to play the piano.  

In 2002, he released a solo album entitled A Matter of Style, which includes cover versions of George and Ira Gershwin's "Embraceable You" and the Thom Bell and Linda Creed song "Jealousy", originally recorded by Dionne Warwick.

In 2004, Thompkins Jr. started a new group, Russell Thompkins Jr. and the New Stylistics, with Raymond Johnson, James Ranton, and Jonathan Buckson. They continue to tour and are featured on the DVD Old School Soul Party Live!, which was part of the PBS My Music series. James Ranton left the group due to health reasons but the group continues as a trio.

In 2007, Thompkins along with Ted Mills (original lead singer of Blue Magic) and William Hart (original lead singer of The Delfonics) teamed up to record an album entitled, "All The Way From Philadelphia", under the name, The 3 Tenors of Soul on Shanachie Records.

As of 2022, Russell Thompkins Jr.& The New Stylistics are still performing and touring in the states and overseas.

Discography

With The Stylistics
Further information: The Stylistics discography

Other Projects
Russell Thompkins Jr.: Matter of Style - 2002 (album)
The 3 Tenors of Soul: All The Way From Philadelphia - 2007 (album)

References

External links 
2009 Interview with Blog Talk Radio
2014 Russell Thompkins Jr. and the New Stylistics Bring 'I'm Gonna Win Tour' to Ontario Convention Center

1951 births
Musicians from Philadelphia
American soul musicians
American tenors
Countertenors
Living people
Singers from Pennsylvania
21st-century African-American male singers
20th-century African-American male singers